Steve Lee (born Stefan Alois in Horgen, Switzerland, August 5, 1963 – October 5, 2010) was a Swiss musician, best known as the vocalist of the band Gotthard.

Biography

In 1979, Lee's first public concert took place at the Aula Magna of Lugano-Trevano, under the name Cromo, with Lee on vocals and drums; Gerard Garganigo on keyboards and vocals; Tiziano Lippmann on keyboards, synthesizers, and sequencers;  Massimo Basso on bass and vocals; and Guido Gagliano on guitar and vocals.

In 1988, Lee joined the group Forsale.

In 1992, in Lugano, along with guitarist Leo Leoni, bassist Marc Lynn, and drummer Hena Habegger, Lee founded the band Krak. Under the lead of bassist and founding member of Krokus, Chris von Rohr, the band changed its name to Gotthard, a name inspired by the Gotthard Pass.

In 2007, Lee was contacted by Arjen Anthony Lucassen to feature on Ayreon's 2008 album 01011001. He sang vocals, alongside other progressive rock and progressive metal singers.

He spoke fluent Italian, German, English, and French.

Steve Lee was killed in a motorcycle accident 10 miles south of Mesquite, Nevada on Interstate 15 when a semi truck hit a parked motorcycle that subsequently struck and killed Lee.
The swiss band Blue Cold Ice Creams dedicated the song Moon of Midnight to him.

Discography

Influences
Lee's musical influences included Led Zeppelin, AC/DC, Whitesnake, Deep Purple, Bon Jovi, Van Halen and Aerosmith. Lee was especially fond of Whitesnake and based his singing style on that of their lead singer David Coverdale .

References

External links

Official Gotthard Website
Official condolence Website
Gotthard Discography
Nordic fan site with a lot of news, pictures and more
Heavy Harmonies page

1963 births
2010 deaths
Motorcycle road incident deaths
Road incident deaths in Nevada
Swiss rock musicians
Swiss male singers
Swiss heavy metal singers
English-language singers from Switzerland
Swiss people of British descent
People from Horgen